The Colourful Dream is a 1952 West German musical comedy film directed by Géza von Cziffra and starring Vera Molnar, Josef Meinrad and Ursula Grabley. It was made at the Tempelhof Studios in Berlin with some location shooting in Italy. The film's sets were designed by Emil Hasler and Walter Kutz. It was made in Gevacolor.

Synopsis
The plot concerns two aspiring young women performers, an actress and an ice skater, who after a failed tour of Italy attempt to get publicity in the newspapers.

Partial cast
Vera Molnar as Marina
Josef Meinrad as Tobby Busch
Felicitas Busi as Ditta Bodin
Walter Giller as Benno
Ursula Grabley as Gloria Gelblich
Oskar Sima as Director Gelblich
Hans Olden as Richard Haller
Ethel Reschke as Mary Miller
Hubert von Meyerinck as Brandini
Madelon Truß as Stella Lauri
Walter Janssen as Tamaroff
Edith Schollwer as Frau Brandini

References

External links

1952 musical comedy films
German musical comedy films
West German films
Films directed by Géza von Cziffra
Films shot at Tempelhof Studios
Films set in Italy
Figure skating films
1950s German-language films
1950s German films